The men's heavyweight event was part of the boxing programme at the 1956 Summer Olympics.  The weight class was allowed boxers of more than 81 kilograms to compete. The competition was held from 24 November to 1 December 1956. 11 boxers from 11 nations competed.

Medalists

Results

First round
 Giacomo Bozzano (ITA) def. Ilkka Koski (FIN), PTS
 Törner Åhsman (SWE) def. Patrick Sharkey (IRL), KO-3
 Lev Mukhin (URS) def. Bozhil Lozanov (BUL), RTD-3

Quarterfinals
 Daniel Bekker (RSA) def. José Giorgetti (ARG), RSC-1
 Pete Rademacher (USA) def. Josef Němec (CZE), RSC-2
 Giacomo Bozzano (ITA) def. Ulrich Nitzschke (GER), PTS
 Lev Mukhin (URS) def. Törner Åhsman (SWE), KO-1

Semifinals
 Pete Rademacher (USA) def. Daniel Bekker (RSA), RSC-3
 Lev Mukhin (URS) def. Giacomo Bozzano (ITA), KO-3

Final
 Pete Rademacher (USA) def. Lev Mukhin (URS), RSC-1

References

 https://web.archive.org/web/20080912181829/http://www.la84foundation.org/6oic/OfficialReports/1956/OR1956.pdf

Heavyweight